is a funicular station in Ikoma, Nara Prefecture, Japan.

Lines 
Kintetsu
■ Kintetsu Ikoma Cable Line (Y19)

Layout 
Umeyashiki Station has a single side platform serving bi-directional traffic.

Adjacent stations 

Railway stations in Japan opened in 1929
Railway stations in Nara Prefecture